China proper, Inner China, or the Eighteen Provinces is a term used by some Western writers in reference to the "core" regions of the Manchu-led Qing dynasty of China. This term is used to express a distinction between the "core" regions populated by the dominant Han population and the "frontier" regions of China, sometimes known as "Outer China". There is no fixed extent for China proper, as many administrative, cultural, and linguistic shifts have occurred in Chinese history. One definition refers to the original area of Chinese civilization, the Central Plain (in the North China Plain); another to the Eighteen Provinces of the Qing dynasty. There is no direct translation for "China proper" in the Chinese language due to differences in terminology used by the Qing to refer to the regions. The expression is controversial among scholars, particularly in China, due to issues pertaining to territorial integrity.

Outer China usually includes the geographical regions of Dzungaria, Tarim Basin, Gobi Desert, Tibetan Plateau, Yunnan–Guizhou Plateau, and Manchuria.

Origin of the concept 
It is not clear when the concept of "China proper" in the Western world appeared. However, it is plausible that historians during the age of empires and the fast-changing borders in the eighteenth century, applied it to distinguish the 18 provinces in China's interior from its frontier territories. This would also apply to Great Britain proper versus the British Empire, which would encompass vast lands overseas. The same would apply to France proper in contrast to the French Empire of the time, which Napoleon managed to expand all the way to Moscow.

According to Harry Harding, the concept can date back to 1827. But as early as in 1795, William Winterbotham adopted this concept in his book. When describing the Chinese Empire under the Qing dynasty, Winterbotham divided it into three parts: China proper, Chinese Tartary, and the states tributary to China. He adopted the opinions of Du Halde and Grosier and suspected that the name of "China" came from Qin dynasty. He then said: "China, properly so called,... comprehends from north to south eighteen degrees; its extent from east to west being somewhat less..."

However, to introduce China proper, Winterbotham still used the outdated 15-province system of the Ming dynasty, which the Qing dynasty maintained until 1662. Although Ming dynasty also had 15 basic local divisions, Winterbotham uses the name of Kiang-nan (Jiāngnán) province, which had been called South Zhili (Nán-Zhílì) during the Ming dynasty and was renamed to Kiang-nan (i.e., Jiangnan) in 1645, the second year after the Qing dynasty replaces the Ming dynasty. This 15-province system was gradually replaced by the 18-province system between 1662 and 1667. Using the 15-province system and the name of Kiang-nan Province indicates that the concept of China proper probably had appeared between 1645 and 1662 and this concept may reflect the idea that identifies China as the territory of the former Ming dynasty after the Ming–Qing transition.

The concept of "China proper" also appeared before this 1795 book. It can be found in The Gentleman's Magazine, published in 1790, and The Monthly Review, published in 1749. In the nineteenth century, the term "China proper" was sometimes used by Chinese officials when they were communicating in foreign languages. For instance, the Qing ambassador to Britain Zeng Jize used it in an English language article, which he published in 1887.

Dulimbai Gurun is the Manchu name for China (Zhongguo; "Middle Kingdom"). After conquering the Ming, the Qing identified their state as "China" (Zhongguo), and referred to it as "Dulimbai Gurun" in the Manchu language. The Qing emperors equated the lands of the Qing state (including both "China proper" and present day Manchuria, Xinjiang, Mongolia, Tibet and other areas) as "China" in both the Chinese and Manchu languages, defining China as a multiethnic state, rejecting the idea that China only meant Han-populated areas in "China proper", proclaiming that both Han and non-Han peoples were part of "China", using "China" to refer to the Qing in official documents, international treaties, and foreign affairs, and the "Chinese language" (Dulimbai gurun i bithe) referred to Chinese, Manchu, and Mongol languages, and the term "Chinese people" (Zhongguo ren; Manchu: Dulimbai gurun i niyalma) referred to all Han, Manchu, and Mongol subjects of the Qing.

When the Qing conquered Dzungaria in 1759, they proclaimed that the new land was absorbed into "China" (Dulimbai Gurun) in a Manchu language memorial. The Qing expounded on their ideology that they were bringing together the "outer" non-Han peoples like the Manchus, Mongols, Uighurs and Tibetans together with the "inner" Han people, into "one family" united under the Qing state, showing that the diverse subjects of the Qing were all part of one family, the Qing used the phrase "Zhong Wai Yi Jia" or "Nei Wai Yi Jia" ("interior and exterior as one family"), to convey this idea of "unification" of the different peoples. A Manchu language version of a treaty with the Russian Empire concerning criminal jurisdiction over bandits called people from the Qing as "people of the Central Kingdom (Dulimbai Gurun)" 

While the Qing dynasty used China (Zhongguo) to describe non-Han areas, some Han scholar-officials opposed the Qing emperor's use of Zhongguo to refer to non-Han areas, using instead Zhongguo to mark a distinction between the culturally Han areas and the territories newly acquired by the Qing empire. In the early 19th century, Wei Yuan’s Shengwuji (Military History of the Qing Dynasty) calls the inner Asian polities guo, while the seventeen provinces of the traditional heartland, that is, "China proper", and three eastern provinces of Manchuria are called "Zhongguo". Some Ming loyalists of Han ethnicity refused to use Zhongguo to refer to areas outside the borders of the Ming Empire such as Outer Mongolia, in effect refusing to acknowledge the legitimacy of the Qing dynasty.

The Qing dynasty referred to the Han-inhabited 18 provinces as "nèidì shíbā shěng", which meant the "interior region eighteen provinces", or abbreviated it as "nèidì", "interior region" and also as "jùnxiàn", while they referred to the non-Han areas of China such as the Northeast, Outer Mongolia, Inner Mongolia, Xinjiang, and Tibet as "wàifān" which means "outer feudatories" or "outer vassals", or as "fānbù" ("feudatory region"). These wàifān were fully subject to and governed by the Qing government and were considered part of China (Zhongguo), unlike wàiguó ("outer/foreign countries") like Korea, Vietnam, the Ryukyus and Japan, who paid tribute to Qing China or were vassal states of China but were not part of China.

Political use 
In the early 20th century, a series of Sino-Japanese conflicts had raised Chinese people's concern for national unity, and the concept of a unified, undivided Chinese nation became more popular among Chinese scholars. On Jan 1, 1939, Gu Jiegang published his article "The term 'China proper' should be abolished immediately", which argued that the widely accepted area covered by "China proper" is not the actual territory of any of the Chinese dynasties. Gu further theorized that "中国本部", the Chinese and Japanese term equal to "China proper" at the time, actually originated from Japan and was translated into "China proper", hence the concept of "China proper" was developed by Japanese people, and it had become a tool to divide Chinese people, making way for the Japanese invasion of Mongolia, Manchuria, and other parts of China. Gu's article sparked a heated debate on the definition and origin of "Zhonghua minzu" (Chinese nation), which contributed to unifying the Chinese people in the Second Sino-Japanese War, and to an extent shaped the later established concept of Zhonghua minzu.

Modern 

Today, China proper is a controversial concept in China itself, since the current official paradigm does not contrast the core and the periphery of China. There is no single widely used term corresponding to it in the Chinese language.

The separation of China into a "China proper" dominated by Han people and other states for ethnic minorities such as East Turkestan for the Uyghurs impugns on the legitimacy of China's current territorial borders, which is based on the succession of states principle. According to Sinologist Colin Mackerras, foreign governments have generally accepted Chinese claims over its ethnic minority areas, because to redefine a country's territory every time it underwent a change of regime would cause endless instability and warfare. Also, he asks, "if the boundaries of the Qing were considered illegitimate, why should it go back to the much smaller Ming in preference to the quite extensive Tang dynasty boundaries?"

Extent 

There is no fixed geographical extent for China proper, as it is used to express the contrast between the core and frontier regions of China from multiple perspectives: historical, administrative, cultural, and linguistic.

Historical perspective 
One way of thinking about China proper is to refer to the long-standing territories held by dynasties of China founded by the Han people. Chinese civilization developed from a core region in the North China Plain, and expanded outwards over several millennia, conquering and assimilating surrounding peoples, or being conquered and influenced in turn. Some dynasties, such as the Han and Tang dynasties, were particularly expansionist, extending far into Inner Asia, while others, such as the Jin and Song dynasties, were forced to relinquish the North China Plain itself to rivaling regimes founded by peoples from the north.

The Ming dynasty was the last orthodox Chinese dynasty of ethnic Han origin and the second-last imperial dynasty of China. It governed fifteen administrative entities, which included thirteen provinces and two "directly-governed" areas. After the Manchu-led Qing dynasty succeeded the Ming dynasty in China proper, the Qing court decided to continue to use the Ming administrative system to rule over former Ming lands, without applying it to other domains under Qing rule, namely Manchuria, Mongolia, Xinjiang, Taiwan and Tibet. The 15 administrative units of the Ming dynasty underwent minor reforms to become the Eighteen Provinces (or ) of China proper under the Qing dynasty. It was these eighteen provinces that early Western sources referred to as China proper.

There are some minor differences between the extent of Ming China and the extent of the eighteen provinces of Qing China: for example, some parts of Manchuria were Ming possessions belonging to the province of Liaodong (now Liaoning); however, the Qing conquered it before entering the Central Plain and did not administer as part of a regular province of China proper. On the other hand, Taiwan was a new acquisition of the Qing dynasty, and it was placed under the administration of Fujian, one of the provinces of China proper. Eastern Kham in Greater Tibet was added to Sichuan, while much of what now constitutes northern Burma was added to Yunnan.

Near the end of the Qing dynasty, there was an effort to extend the province system of China proper to the rest of the empire. Taiwan was converted into a separate province in 1885, but was ceded to Japan in 1895. Xinjiang was reorganized into a province in 1884. Manchuria was split into the three provinces of Fengtian, Jilin and Heilongjiang in 1907. There was discussion to do the same in Tibet, Qinghai (Kokonor), Inner Mongolia, and Outer Mongolia, but these proposals were not put to practice, and these areas were outside the provincial system of China proper when the Qing dynasty fell in 1912.

The Provinces of the Qing Dynasty were:

Some of the revolutionaries who sought to overthrow Qing rule desired to establish a state independent of the Qing dynasty within the bounds of the Eighteen Provinces, as evinced by the Eighteen-Star Flag they used. Others favoured the replacement of the entire Qing dynasty by a new republic, as evinced by the Five-Striped Flag they used. Some revolutionaries, such as Zou Rong, used the term Zhongguo Benbu which roughly identifies the Eighteen Provinces. When the Qing dynasty fell, the abdication decree of the Xuantong Emperor bequeathed all the territories of the Qing dynasty to the new Republic of China, and the latter idea was therefore adopted by the new republic as the principle of Five Races Under One Union, with Five Races referring to the Han, Manchus, Mongols, Muslims (Uyghurs, Hui etc.) and Tibetans. The Five-Striped Flag was adopted as the national flag, and the Republic of China viewed itself as a single unified state encompassing all five regions handed down by the Qing dynasty. The People's Republic of China, which was founded in 1949 and replaced the Republic of China on the Chinese mainland, has continued to claim essentially the same borders, with the only major exception being the recognition of an independent Mongolia. As a result, the concept of China proper fell out of favour in China.

The Eighteen Provinces of the Qing dynasty still largely exist, but their boundaries have changed. Beijing and Tianjin were eventually split from Hebei (renamed from Zhili), Shanghai from Jiangsu, Chongqing from Sichuan, Ningxia autonomous region from Gansu, and Hainan from Guangdong. Guangxi is now an autonomous region. The provinces that the late Qing dynasty set up have also been kept: Xinjiang became an autonomous region under the People's Republic of China, while the three provinces of Manchuria now have somewhat different borders, with Fengtian renamed as Liaoning.

When the Qing dynasty fell, Republican Chinese control of Qing territories, including of those generally considered to be in "China proper", was tenuous, and non-existent in Tibet and Outer Mongolia since 1922, which were controlled by governments that declared independence from China. The Republic of China subdivided Inner Mongolia in its time on the mainland, although the People's Republic of China later joined Mongol-inhabited territories into a single autonomous region. The PRC joined the Qamdo area into the Tibet area (later the Tibet Autonomous Region). The Republic of China was forced to acknowledge the independence of Mongolia in 1945, but the recognition was later revoked in 1953.

Ethnic perspective 

China proper is often associated with the Han people, the majority ethnic group of China and with the extent of the Chinese languages, an important unifying element of the Han ethnicity.

However, Han regions in the present day do not correspond well to the Eighteen Provinces of the Qing dynasty. Much of southwestern China, such as areas in the provinces of Yunnan, Guangxi, and Guizhou, was part of successive dynasties of ethnic Han origin, including the Ming dynasty and the Eighteen Provinces of the Qing dynasty. However, these areas were and continue to be populated by various non-Han minority groups, such as the Zhuang, the Miao people, and the Bouyei. Conversely, Han people form the majority in most of Manchuria, much of Inner Mongolia, many areas in Xinjiang and scattered parts of Tibet today, not least due to the expansion of Han settlement encouraged by the late Qing dynasty, the Republic of China, and the People's Republic of China.

Ethnic Han is not synonymous with speakers of the Chinese language. Many non-Han ethnicities, such as the Hui and Manchu, are essentially monolingual in the Chinese language, but do not identify as ethnic Han. The Chinese language itself is also a complex entity, and should be described as a family of related languages rather than a single language if the criterion of mutual intelligibility is used to classify its subdivisions.

In polls the majority of the people of Taiwan call themselves "Taiwanese" only with the rest identifying as "Taiwanese and Chinese" or "Chinese" only. 98% of the people of Taiwan are descendants of immigrants from Mainland China since the 1600s, but the inclusion of Taiwan in the definition of China proper, is still a controversial subject. See History of Taiwan and Political status of Taiwan for more information.

See also 

Names of China
Annam
 Chinese world
Greater China
 Mainland China
 Metropole
 North China Plain
 Inner Asia
Qing dynasty in Inner Asia
 Outer Mongolia
 Outer Manchuria
 Sinocentrism
 Zhonghua Minzu
 Chinese macro-regions—Socio-economic divisions of China proper
 Willow Palisade
 Great Wall of China
 Serbia proper

Notes

References

Citations

Sources 

 
 Du Halde, Jean-Baptiste (1736). The General History of China. Containing a geographical, historical, chronological, political and physical description of the empire of China, Chinese-Tartary, Corea and Thibet..., London: J. Watts.
 Grosier, Jean-Baptiste (1788). A General Description of China. Containing the topography of the fifteen provinces which compose this vast empire, that of Tartary, the isles, and other tributary countries..., London: G.G.J. and J. Robinson.
 Darby, William (1827). Darby's Universal Gazetteer, or, A New Geographical Dictionary. ... Illustrated by a ... Map of the United States (p. 154),. Philadelphia: Bennett and Walton.

External links

 China The Catholic Encyclopedia
 Photographic survey of Outer China

Historical regions
Geography of China
Metropolitan or continental parts of states